Michael Tongun is a South Sudanese politician. As of 2011, he is the Minister of Co-Operatives & Rural Development of Central Equatoria.

References

21st-century South Sudanese politicians
Living people
People from Central Equatoria
Year of birth missing (living people)
Place of birth missing (living people)